The Scottish National League was first played for in 1997 under the name The Scottish Conference before changing to its current name the following season and is the top tier domestic rugby league club competition in Scotland. It was renamed the Scottish RL Conference League between 2007 and 2011 and formed a division of the Rugby League Conference competition.

History 

The first domestic Scottish club were the Forth & Clyde Nomads who played in the 95/96 North-East League but folded shortly before the announcement about a new Scottish rugby league competition. They made history when they won the first ever domestic competition, the Scottish Challenge Cup in 1996 beating Stirling University 30–24.

The first title was won by Lomond Valley Raiders who beat Central Centurions in the final of the first domestic competition. The following three seasons saw different champions each season, Border Raiders in their debut season in 1998, Edinburgh Eagles in 1999 against fellow Edinburgh side Portobello Playboys and Glasgow Bulls in 2000, before in 2001 the Eagles lifted the first of a hat-trick of title wins. In 2002 the league ran two 4 team divisions but reverted to one division the following season. The Eagles dominance was ended by Fife Lions in the 2004 Grand Final. The following season saw one season wonders Royal Scots Steelers from Edinburgh beat Fife Lions in the final. The Lions regained the title in 2006 before the Edinburgh Eagles returned for a second hat-trick run of title successes including the first two against Fife Lions. In 2010 a new name was carved onto the trophy when Carluke Tigers gained revenge for their previous seasons final defeat in extra-time against Edinburgh Eagles by defeating the all-conquering team 14–10. The Eagles lifted the next two titles against finals debutants Ayrshire Storm in 2011 and Aberdeen Warriors in 2012. In that 2011 season the league once again ran two divisions this time on a regional basis Central and North. This lasted until 2014. Aberdeen Warriors won four straight titles 2013–16. 2017 saw Strathmore Silverbacks lift their 1st title pipping the Edinburgh Eagles to the title. 2018 saw the Eagles return to the top of the pack after 6 years overturning the 2017 Champions Strathmore Silverbacks on points difference. 2019 saw Strathmore collect their second title pipping Glasgow RL to the title. Edinburgh Eagles picked up the league and cup double in 2021.

Many of the teams also run junior teams in the National Youth League.

Current Clubs

Champions

1997 season 

The inaugural Scottish Conference kicked off on 27 July when Linlithgow Lions lost at home against Lomond Valley Raiders 50–68. Five teams contested that debut season, eventual champions Lomond Valley Raiders, runners-up Central Centurions, Linlithgow Lions, Inverness RL and Glasgow based Whitecraigs Warriors. The Raiders went through the season unbeaten.

Final

1998 season 

Five teams once again contested the newly retitled Scottish National League new clubs Edinburgh Eagles, Border Raiders and Glasgow Bulls replaced Central Centurions, Inverness RL and Whitecraigs Warriors. The Border Raiders who had former Great Britain international Hugh Waddell in their ranks lifted the title when they beat Edinburgh Eagles in the inaugural Grand Final at Hillhead Sports Club in Glasgow 40–14. As champions the Raiders were entered into the Challenge Cup and on 6 December 1998 history was made when they took to the field against Wath Brow Hornets at Hillhead Sports Club losing by only 10–34.

Final

1999 season 

The league increased to six clubs with Edinburgh based Portobello Playboys joining the league. The Grand Final was once again played at Hillhead Sports Club in Glasgow and was contested by the two Edinburgh clubs following their play-off victories against Border Raiders and Linlithgow Lions. In the final table toppers and favourites Edinburgh Eagles beat Portobello Playboys 48–20. As champions the Eagles progressed into the Challenge Cup and a round 1 home meeting with top amateur side Woolston Rovers. After being 0-16 down at half-time the club nearly pulled off an almighty shock before going down 12–17.

Final

2000 season 

The same six teams competed, one though, Lomond Valley Raiders changed their name to Rhu Raiders. Off the field Scotland Rugby League were officially recognised by SportScotland in October 1999 and on the field it seemed a certainty that Edinburgh Eagles would retain their title having gone through the season losing just one game to reach the Grand Final. Their opponents were Glasgow Bulls who having finished in 4th place with 5 wins and 5 defeats had reached the final following play-off wins over Rhu Raiders and league runners-up Border Raiders. In the final the Bulls pulled off a massive upset in winning 47–22 at Royal High Corstorphine RFC in Edinburgh. In the Challenge Cup the Glasgow Bulls lost heavily to Wigan Rose Bridge 0-72.

Final

2001 season 

The same six clubs competed again in a season disrupted by an outbreak of foot-and-mouth. Once again Edinburgh Eagles and Glasgow Bulls contested the Grand Final having gone through the season losing just one game, against each other. In the final played at West of Scotland FC in Glasgow the Eagles came out on top 30–16, at one point they led 30–0. In the Challenge Cup the Eagles lost at home to Leigh East 10–68.

Final

2002 season 

The league expanded to two divisions of four. Division 1 consisted of reigning champions Edinburgh Eagles, runners-up Glasgow Bulls, Portobello Playboys and Dumbarton Dragons who were previously known as Rhu Raiders but had relocated to Loch Lomond. In Division 2 were Border Raiders, Fife Lions who were previously called Linlithgow Lions but moved to Fife and two new clubs south Glasgow based Lanarkshire Storm and Clyde Buccaneers. Portobello won Division 1 remaining unbeaten and defeated 3rd placed Glasgow Bulls in the play-offs, in the other play-off Edinburgh Eagles saw off Division 2 winners Fife Lions 58–6. In the Grand Final played at Cavalry Park in Edinburgh Edinburgh Eagles beat the Portobello Playboys 46–24. In the Challenge Cup Edinburgh Eagles lost at home to Oulton Raiders in the first round 8-26.

Ladder

Division 1

Division 2 

Source: Results

Final

2003 season 

The league reverted to one division and also lost two clubs. Lanarkshire Storm resigned after just one season and Dumbarton Dragons who as Lomond Valley Raiders won the first title, also failed to start the season. Reigning champions Edinburgh Eagles went through the season unbeaten and dispatched first time finalists Fife Lions in the final. In the Challenge Cup first round Edinburgh Eagles lost out to Heworth ARLFC 8-34.

Ladder

Final

2004 season 

The 2004 season only had four clubs, Border Raiders who were champions in their debut season in 1998 called it a day after failing to find a suitable ground to use and Glasgow Bulls decided to take a seasons break to reorganise the club following their benefactor Bradford Bulls getting into financial difficulty. The season itself was exciting as all four clubs had a chance of reaching the Grand Final going into the final games. In the end we had a repeat of the previous years final but this time a different and new winner. Fife Lions beat Edinburgh Eagles in the final 36–24 to lift their first title. As champions they represented Scotland in the Challenge Cup but were beaten at South London Sharks 10–42.

Ladder

Final

2005 season 

It was all change for this season as two clubs left the competition Portobello Playboys and Clyde Buccaneers one returned after a years absence Glasgow Bulls and three made their debut Royal Scots Steelers from Edinburgh, Moray Eels based at RAF Lossiemouth and east Glasgow based Easterhouse Panthers. Fife Lions finished top of the table winning all their matches to reach the Grand Final while new boys Royal Scots Steelers caused a surprise and also reached the final after beating fellow Edinburgh side Edinburgh Eagles in the play-offs. In the final the Steelers shocked the Lions 56–46 to win in their debut season. The Royal Scots Steelers did not enter the Challenge Cup.

Ladder

Final

2006 season 

2006 saw the loss of defending champions Royal Scots Steelers after just one campaign their place being taken up by Paisley Hurricanes. Fife Lions for the 3rd year running finished top of the table and went on to claim their second championship. After getting past Glasgow Bulls in the semi-final they met and beat Moray Eels who'd surprisingly beaten Edinburgh Eagles in the other semi-final. In the Challenge Cup Fife were beaten at Normanton Knights 8–46 in the first round.

Ladder

Final

2007 season 

The 2007 season brought stability to the league as the same clubs once again competed. The season also brought a name change to the Co-operative Scottish Rugby League Conference as the league formed part of the national Rugby League Conference. Fife Lions for the 4th season in a row finished top losing just one game, which was against their perennial contenders, Edinburgh Eagles. Not surprisingly the two clubs won their play-off semi-finals against Moray Eels and Paisley Hurricanes and in the final Edinburgh Eagles won to lift their 5th title. In the Challenge Cup the Eagles lost out to Normanton Knights in Yorkshire 8-38.

Ladder

Final

2008 season 

The league lost one club but gained two as 7 clubs competed. Glasgow Bulls having lost all their games the previous season folded and were replaced in the west end of Glasgow by Jordanhill Phoenix and Carluke Tigers from Lanarkshire were the other new club. Edinburgh Eagles retained their title after thrashing Fife Lions in the final 54–4 at the Royal High Corstorphine RFC in Edinburgh. Debutants Carluke Tigers finished second in the league losing out to Fife Lions in the semi-final, in the other semi-final Edinburgh Eagles saw off Paisley Hurricanes. In the Challenge Cup the Eagles made history when they became the first Scottish side to win a game beating the RAF in the first round 18–16, in the second round they lost narrowly at Leeds Met 6-20.

Ladder

Final

2009 season 

Like the previous season the league lost one club and gained two as the competition reached eight clubs. Paisley Hurricanes surprisingly called it a day despite having reached the play-offs the previous two seasons. Coming in were Hillfoots Rams who would be based at Hillfoots RFC in Clackmannanshire and Victoria Knights from south Glasgow and playing out of Nethercraigs, a club that was already running several successful youth sides. On the field Edinburgh Eagles once again dominated remaining unbeaten all season and lifting the title after beating Carluke Tigers in the final albeit after extra time 18–10 at GHA RFC in Glasgow. In the Challenge Cup the Eagles once again won in the first round beating Gloucestershire Warriors away 36–32. In the second round they were beaten by Welsh club Blackwood Bulldogs 16–28 at Meggetland Sports Complex in Edinburgh.

Ladder

Final

2010 season 

There were changes again before the season commenced with eight clubs. Three teams departed Hillfoots Rams after one season, and two Glasgow clubs Jordanhill Phoenix and Victoria Knights who returned to being a youth set-up. Joining the ranks were the first ever Scottish rugby league club Forth & Clyde Nomads who had been formed in 1995 and had competed in the North-East League in England. The other two clubs were newly formed, Ayrshire Storm based at Irvine and Falkirk Romans. Reigning champions Edinburgh Eagles finished top of the table closely followed by the previous seasons runners-up Carluke Tigers. In the play-offs Carluke shocked the Eagles by winning in Edinburgh 24–16 to reach the Grand Final. Edinburgh got past Moray Eels who had put out Ayrshire Storm to eventually reach the Final. In the final played at GHA RFC in Glasgow Carluke repeated their play-off victory to lift their first title 14–10. In the Challenge Cup the Tigers lost away at Woolston Rovers 18–44.

Ladder

Final

2011 season 

The league structure was changed with the re-introduction of two divisions effectively north and south, but actually called 1 and 2. Two clubs left Falkirk Romans and Forth & Clyde Nomads both after competing in one season. Newcomers who all joined Division 2 were Aberdeen Warriors, Ross Sutherland RL and Elgin based Moray Titans. In Division 1 Edinburgh Eagles led the way winning all their games followed by Ayrshire Storm behind these two, who would contest the Grand Final, were Carluke Tigers, Fife Lions and Easterhouse Panthers. Division 2 was won by Aberdeen Warriors who like Edinburgh won all their games behind them came Moray Tians, Moray Eels and finally Ross Sutherland RL. In the Division 1 Grand Final Edinburgh saw off debutant finalists Ayrshire 26–10 at GHA RFC in Glasgow. In the Challenge Cup Edinburgh were heavily defeated at Stanley Rangers 12–60.

Final

2012 season 

The Scottish rugby league left the English Rugby League Conference umbrella and under a brand new title Scottish Conference set about on an independent course. Two leagues remained this time renamed the Central Conference and the Northern Conference. Unfortunately the champions of 2010 Carluke Tigers failed to make the start replacing them were East Lothian Hawks from Haddington. The competition also saw both Edinburgh Eagles and Aberdeen Warriors run 'A' teams. In the Central Conference Edinburgh Eagles finished top ahead of Ayrshire Storm who they then beat in the play-off 52–18. In the Northern Conference Aberdeen Warriors came top ahead of Edinburgh Eagles 'A' who they beat 80–4 in their play-off. In the Grand Final played at Falkirk RFC Edinburgh won their 9th title winning 36–10.

Final

2013 season 

For the 2nd year, Scottish Conference East Lothian Hawks and the two 'A' teams of Edinburgh and Aberdeen did not compete while Victoria Knights returned as a senior side for the second time following their campaign in 2009. In the Central Conference Easterhouse Panthers surprisingly finished top ahead of Edinburgh Eagles with Ayrshire Storm, Fife Lions and newboys Victoria Knights following. In the Northern Conference Aberdeen Warriors dominated finishing top and unbeaten, followed by Moray Titans, Moray Eels and finally Ross Sutherland RL. The play-off semi-finals brought victories for the two league leaders Easterhouse Panthers against Moray Titans and Aberdeen Warriors 22–20 against Edinburgh Eagles. In the Grand Final at Falkirk RFC the Aberdeen Warriors won their first title 30–28 against the Easterhouse Panthers.

Ladder

Central Conference

Northern Conference

Final

2014 season 

The Scottish rugby league secured its first sponsor when Deuchars IPA agreed a four-year deal. The competition named Deuchars IPA National League suffered from a plethora of clubs leaving, which was partly due to the RFL withdrawing all their funding to the Scottish Rugby League. Two-time former champions Fife Lions were the biggest name to go; after appearing in the previous 17 campaigns they decided to call it a day after a couple of seasons of struggle both on and off the pitch. Victoria Knights lasted just one season for the second time, deciding to fully concentrate on their youth clubs. Also leaving were three clubs from the north: Ross Sutherland RL, Moray Eels and Moray Titans. The season itself saw Aberdeen Warriors lay down a marker for their continued dominance as they went through the season undefeated, leading them to their second title after beating Edinburgh Eagles 30–20 in the final played in Aberdeen at the Hazlehead Academy. In the Challenge Cup champions Aberdeen Warriors made their debut but were heavily beaten at Pilkington Recs 4-46.

Ladder

Final

2015 season 

Four clubs once again competed but Ayrshire Storm left to be replaced by Forfar based Strathmore Silverbacks. The season saw a combination of home and away games and nines tournaments, hosted by all the clubs, to decide the two finalists. By the end of the season Aberdeen Warriors had qualified for the Grand Final along with debutants Strathmore Silverbacks but were then proclaimed champions after no final was played. In the Challenge Cup the Warriors lost narrowly at top side Skirlaugh Bulls 20–27.

Final

2016 season 

The same four clubs competed for the title with reigning champions Aberdeen Warriors and Strathmore Silverbacks finishing as the top two and therefore reaching the Grand Final. In the final underdogs Strathmore gave a good account of themselves before going down to a 48–32 defeat to the Warriors who registered their fourth straight title success at Montrose RFC. In the Challenge Cup Aberdeen lost at Northumbria University 16–42.

Ladder

Final

2017 season 

Strathmore 30-54 Aberdeen

Strathmore 42-28 Edinburgh

Edinburgh 36-34 Aberdeen

Final 

Source:

2018 season 

Edinburgh 42-34 Strathmore

Final 

Source:

2019 season

Ladder 

Note: (C) = Champions

2021 season

Ladder 

Note: (C) = Champions

Source:

Club Records

See also

 Rugby league in Scotland
 List of rugby league competitions

References

External links

Rugby League Conference
Rugby league in Scotland
Rugby
Rugby league competitions in the United Kingdom